Sir Henry Wroth (d. 1671), second son of Henry, Sir Robert Wroth's youngest son, acquired some fame as a royalist during the civil wars, was a 'pensioner' of Charles I, and was knighted at Oxford on 15 September 1645. He compounded with the parliament for £60.  He was granted land in Ireland and succeeded to Durrants (or Durants), an estate at Enfield in Middlesex,  on the death of his uncle John. He was commissioned captain of a troop in the Royal Horse Guards in 1661.

In 1664 Wroth, with a party of horse, escorted Colonel John Hutchinson from the Tower of London on the road to Sandown Castle, Kent. He was a patron of Thomas Fuller, who dedicated his Pisgah Sight (1650) to him. Fuller often visited Wroth at Durrants.  

He married Anne (1632–77), daughter of William, Lord Maynard of Wicklow. He died on 22 September 1671. His second daughter Jane married William Nassau de Zuylestein, 1st Earl of Rochford in 1681 .

References

Attribution

1671 deaths
Cavaliers
Year of birth unknown
Royal Horse Guards officers